The Select Committee on Statutory Instruments is a select committee of the House of Commons in the Parliament of the United Kingdom. The remit of the committee is to scrutinise statutory instruments made in exercise of powers granted by Act of Parliament where the instrument has been laid before the House of Commons only. The committee's responsibilities are those the Joint Committee on Statutory Instruments has with respect to instruments laid before both Houses, and its members are the Commons members of the joint committee.

Membership
As of May 2021, the members of the committee are as follows:

Changes since 2019

2017-2019 Parliament
Members were announced on 30 October 2017.

Changes 2017-2019

2015-2017 Parliament
Members were announced on 13 July 2015.

Changes 2015-2017

2010-2015 Parliament
Members were announced on 12 July 2010.

Changes 2010-2015

See also
List of Committees of the United Kingdom Parliament

References

External links
Select Committee on Statutory Instruments

Select Committees of the British House of Commons
Statutory Instruments of the United Kingdom